Robert Chandler (fl. 1420–1429) was an English politician.

He was a Member (MP) of the Parliament of England for Devizes in 1420, 1425 and 1429.

References

Year of birth missing
Year of death missing
English MPs 1420
People from Devizes
English MPs 1425
English MPs 1429